Coprosma cordicarpa, known as pilo, is a species of plant endemic to the Hawaiian island of Maui. It is locally common in high-elevation dry forests and shrublands of leeward East Maui. It can be distinguished from other Hawaiian Coprosma by its heart-shaped fruit. It is classified as Endangered on the IUCN Red List due to a heavy population decline caused by invasive species.

References

cordicarpa
Endemic flora of Hawaii
Plants described in 2016